Sabrina Dhawan is an Indian screenwriter and producer, born in England and raised in Delhi, India.

Dhawan is an associate professor and the area head of screenwriting at the Tisch School of the Arts, New York University. She has been commissioned to write for many large companies including Disney, HBO, ABC Family and 20th Century Fox. She has taught at filmmaking labs all over the world.

Dhawan is most well known for her writing credits on various feature-length films, as well as some producing and directing work on her own independent short films. She works a great deal within Indian and Bollywood cinema. Monsoon Wedding, a 2001 film directed by Mira Nair, is one of her earliest and most well known works, launching her screenwriting career.

Dhawan has a brief acting cameo in Monsoon Wedding as a wedding guest.

Early life 

Dhawan was born in England and raised in Delhi. Dhawan attended both the Convent of Jesus and Mary as well as Delhi Public School for her elementary education. She then went on to Hindu College to obtain her Bachelor of Arts and to Leicester University, U.K. for a Masters of Arts in Communications Research. Dhawan then moved to New York City, where she graduated from Columbia University's Graduate Film Program in 2001 with a Masters of Fine Arts in Film.

Her student short film, (Saanjh) As Night Falls, which she made during the last years of her MFA, has been extremely successful since its release in 2000.

Personal life 

In 2006, Dhawan married Steve Cohen, who wrote the screenplay for The Bachelor (1999) starring Chris O'Donnell and Renée Zellweger. Her husband died 6 years later on 29 September 2012.

Dhawan currently lives in New York City with their son, Kabir.

Career 

Graduating from Columbia in 2001, the same year as the release of Monsoon Wedding, Dhawan's career was almost immediate. In fact, Dhawan wrote the first draft of the screenplay while she was still in school - it only took her about a week. Fusing Hindi, Punjabi, and English, Dhawan wrote the multi-lingual script for Monsoon Wedding. The film was premiered in the Marché du Film section of the 2001 Cannes Film Festival and was nominated for various awards, including a Golden Globe.

After their pairing on Monsoon Wedding, Dhawan and Nair formed a brief partnership in which Dhawan worked as Nair's assistant at Columbia sometime in the early 2000s. She also wrote the segment "India" (directed by Nair) in 11'09"01 September 11, a series of short films for Canal Plus in 2002.

Dhawan's short film (Saanjh) As Night Falls was awarded the Best of the Festival at the Palm Springs International Festival of Short Films. It also received the Audience Award at Angelus Awards; and was voted "Most Original Film," by New Line Cinema at the Polo Ralph Lauren New Works Festival in 2000.

In 2009, Dhawan acted as co-producer for the first three episodes of a TV Series titled Bollywood Hero. Since her short film in 2000, Dhawan has written for 9 other projects (feature films, documentaries, TV series) leading up to today.

In 2016, Dhawan co-wrote the film Rangoon, with Vishal Bharadwaj and Matthew Robbins.

Dhawan worked with Mira Nair to create a stage adaptation of Monsoon Wedding which ran at the Berkeley Repertory Theater in California in 2017.

Filmography

Awards and nominations

References

External links 
 
 https://www.imdb.com/title/tt0486531/awards?ref_=tt_awd

1969 births
Living people
Indian women screenwriters
Tisch School of the Arts faculty
English emigrants to India
Writers from London
20th-century English writers
20th-century Indian women writers
20th-century Indian dramatists and playwrights
Women writers from Delhi
Hindi screenwriters
Columbia University School of the Arts alumni
Screenwriters from Delhi